Club Celaya is a Mexican professional football club based in Celaya, Guanajuato. Celaya currently plays in the Liga de Expansión MX. Initially formed on Sunday 7 February 1954, the team was reorganized in Winter 2003 after their city neighbour Atlético Celaya lost its license to Colibríes de Morelos and moved to Primera División A, through the moving of La Piedad to Celaya.

History

Early years (1954–1970)
Celaya was established as a football club on 7 February 1954 as Celaya Fútbol Club, A.C. by Miguel Iriarte Montes, the first club president. Celaya registered in the Segunda División Profesional, which at that time it was the second most important league in Mexico. In its second year of existence the club finished runner-up to Monterrey, who achieved to promotion to the Mexican Primera División.

In 1957–58 the club achieved promotion after winning the season. The club did not lose in their first 18 games. The club's promotion became official on 15 December 1957 when the club defeated Nacional 2–1 under the management of the Argentine Florencio Caffaratti. Celaya replace relegated Tampico Madero. Celaya played in Primera División de México from 1958 to 1961 and disappeared in the 1970s. After reactivation, they played in Primera División A (second level) and became a farm team of Querétaro. When this club was relegated after 2006–07 season, Celaya was absorbed and disappeared.

The club made its first division appearance on 13 July 1958 against América, losing 4–1. The first goal scored in the top division was by Felipe Negrete in a confusing play, although Mateo De la Tijera possibly should have been credited. The club struggled in its first games and did not win till round 8 when they beat Zamora 3–2. The club managed to stay in its league by just one point over last-place Cuautla. That year the club finished 13 in the league with 19 points, winning 4 games. Ranulfo "Chapulin" Rosas  was the club's top scorer with 8 followed by Jones and Appicciafoco with 5.

For the 1959–60 tournament the club showed little improvement, finishing 12th in the league with 12 points, leaving the relegation fight to Atletico Morelia and Zamora. Ferreyra was that year's top scorer with 9 goals, followed by Ortiz with 8 and Cabañas with 4.

The club's mediocre play caught up with it in the 1960–61 tournament. After finishing last with a record of 6 wins, 7 draws and 13 losses totaling 19 points it was relegated. The club had started the tournament red hot but cooled when trainer Florencio Caffaratti left, elevating Gabriel Uñate who failed to win a single game. In that relegated squad Quaglia, J. Mercado and Ismael Ferreyra were the few players who had a good year scoring 7, 5, and 4 goals in order.

1970–1993
The club spent the 1960s in Second division where after 10 mediocre years, the club finally folded in the 1970s. A few years later the club along with club Tecnológico de Celaya was brought back to give Celaya professional football. Club Celaya enrolled in the Tercera División de México and in the 1973–74  the club won the league. Club Celaya lost the 1975–76 Segunda División de México final to San Luis and Tecnológico de Celaya would later be relegated to Tercera División de México.

The club spent the 1980s playing on and off in the Segunda B before taking some time off and reappearing in Segunda A in 1991. From 1991 to 1993 2 clubs again represented the city; club Celaya and Linces Celaya.

Atletico Celaya era (1994–2004)
The club returned in 1994 when the two second-division clubs Atlético Cuernavaca (Morelos) and Escuadra Celeste de Celaya (Guanajuato) merged. Another team, Atlético Español – not to be mistaken for the same-named Mexico City team – was merged later.

All merging clubs brought a piece of their old identity into the new club: Atlético Cuernavaca offered its name; Celeste de Celaya offered their light blue colors and Atlético Español provided their mascot, the bull, engendering their nickname toros (bulls).

Atlético Celaya under Enrique Fernández Prado administration took the second-division position of their predecessors and immediately reached the top level. They joined Primera División after winning the 1994–1995 Liga de Ascenso tournament where they managed to beat Pachuca. Prior to the 1995–96 tournament the club brought in former Real Madrid greats Emilio Butragueño and Hugo Sánchez who led the club to the Final with a record of 14/10/10 for a total of 52 points, qualifying them for the quarter-finals for the first time in club history. The club defeated Monterrey in the quarter-finals, first in Monterrey, ending in a 2–2 draw, then in Celaya where the clubs again tied, 0–0. In the semi-finals they faced Tiburones Rojos de Veracruz, first in Veracruz where Celaya took a 1–0 series advantage, then in Celaya where Celaya scored 5 goals, reaching its first Final in the Mexican Primera División. In the final the club faced Necaxa, who had beaten Tigres UANL in the quarter-finals and América in the semi-finals. In the Celaya match the clubs drew at 1–1. In the following Mexico city contest they tied at 0–0. In a controversial decision the league decided not to play extra time or a penalty shootout and awarded Necaxa the title for their away goal in Celaya.

In the 1996–97 tournament the club finished last in group 4 at 5/10/2 for a total of 17 points.

Thereafter the club inhabited the lower regions. They had financial problems which led to the sale of their first-division-license in winter 2002–03. When Atlético Celaya has disappeared, their older city neighbor Club Celaya was reactivated again when La Piedad moved to Celaya. This club was made up by well-known players Mauro Néstor Gerk, Antonio Lomelí, Felipe Robles, Luis Fernando "Scoponi" Sandoval, Nasa, Javier Chávez González, David Pacheco and Josemir Lujambio but the club folded yet again 2004.

Modern times
The club once again revived in 2007 when the city and First division club Querétaro came to an agreement where Celaya would be Queretaros Primera A affiliate. The club's first year back qualified for the play-offs, but in a controversial decision the club was eliminated by the federation for an ineligible player. The club was later sold due to the fact the Querétaro had been relegated from the first division which allowed two clubs to be operated by the same owner. The club has been playing in the Segunda División de México since 2008. In the 2010 Apertura the club defeated Tampico Madero in the final and was crowned the champion in Tamaulipas.

Stadium

Estadio Miguel Alemán was built and opened in 1954 in Celaya, Guanajuato. It was rebuilt 40 years later to the guidelines of the Mexican Football Federation and host to the first league meet. It was renamed in honor of President Miguel Alemán Valdés. Local teams including FC Celaya (1958–61) and Atletico Celaya Bulls (1995–02) played there.

Capacity stands at 23,182 spectators. Its design is similar to a traditional English stadium grandstand.

Crest and colours
The club's original colors in the 1950s were red and white. In the late 1980s and early 1990s, the club started using black and white with a topical v shape across the chest for home games and a black stripe shirt for away games, which they still use to this date.

Colours
First kit evolution

Honours

Segunda División: (2)
Champion : 1957–58, Apertura 2010

Tercera División de México: (1)
Champion : 1973–74

Records
Tournaments in Primera División: 14
Season in  Primera División "A": 1
Best year Primera División: 
Worst finish in Primera División: 
Largest win margin: 
Largest loss margin: 
Most points in  a tournament
Long tournaments: 
Short tournament: 
 Most goals in a tournament
Long tournaments: 
Short tournament: 
 Most wins in a Tournament
Long tournaments: 
Short tournament: 
Most consecutive wins:  
Most losses in a tournament: 
Most consecutive games without winning: 14, 1958–59
Fewest wins in a tournament: 
Fewest losses in a tournament: 
Player with most goal scored: 
Player with most goals scored in a game:

Personnel

Coaching staff

Players

First-team squad

Out on loan

Reserve teams
Lobos ULMX
Reserve team that plays in the Liga Premier in the third level of the Mexican league system.

Celaya F.C. (Liga TDP)
Reserve team that plays in the Liga TDP, the fourth level of the Mexican league system.

Managers
 Sergio Rubio (2007)
 Miguel de Jesús Fuentes (2009–12)
 Gustavo Díaz (2015–2017)
 Ricardo Valiño (2017–2018)
 Enrique Maximiliano Meza (2018)
 José Islas (2018–2019)
 Héctor Altamirano (2019–2020)
 Israel Hernández Pat (2020–2022)
 Paco Ramírez (2022–present)

See also
Mexican Primera División
Liga de Ascenso
Segunda División Profesional

Footnotes

External links
 Official website

 
Football clubs in Celaya
Association football clubs established in 1954
1954 establishments in Mexico
Ascenso MX teams